The 1988 North Texas Mean Green football team was an American football team that represented the University of North Texas during the 1988 NCAA Division I-AA football season as a member of the Southland Conference. In their seventh year under head coach Corky Nelson, the team compiled a 8–4 record.

Schedule

References

North Texas State
North Texas Mean Green football seasons
North Texas State Mean Green football